The 2019 ASUN men's basketball tournament was the conference postseason tournament for the ASUN Conference. The tournament was the 40th year the league has conducted a postseason tournament. The tournament was held March 4, 7, and 10, 2019 at campus sites of the higher seeds. Liberty upset top-seeded Lipscomb 74–68 in the championship game to win the tournament, and the conference's automatic bid to the NCAA tournament.

Seeds

Because North Alabama is in the first year of a four-year transition from NCAA Division II to Division I, it will not be eligible to compete in either the NCAA Tournament or the NCAA-operated NIT. Should the Lions win the ASUN tournament final, the ASUN's automatic NCAA Tournament bid goes either to Lipscomb or to Liberty if Liberty advances further than Lipscomb in the A-Sun tournament.

Schedule

Bracket

See also
 2018–19 NCAA Division I men's basketball season
 ASUN men's basketball tournament
 2019 ASUN women's basketball tournament

References

External links 
ASUN Men's Basketball Championship Details

ASUN men's basketball tournament
Tournament
Atlantic Sun men's basketball tournament